Gavião e Atalaia is a civil parish in the municipality of Gavião, Portugal. It was formed in 2013 by the merger of the former parishes Gavião and Atalaia. The population in 2011 was 1,747, in an area of 77.88 km2.

References

Freguesias of Gavião, Portugal